"You've Got the Power" is a song written by James Brown and Famous Flames member Johnny Terry and recorded by Brown with Bea Ford as a duet in 1960. Released as the B-side of Brown and the Famous Flames' hit recording of "Think", it also charted, reaching #14 R&B and #86 Pop. It was Brown's first recorded duet and his first hit B-side. Brown briefly performs the song in a medley on his 1963 album Live at the Apollo.

An alternate take of "You've Got the Power" is included on the 1998 compilation album James Brown's Original Funky Divas.

References

James Brown songs
Songs written by James Brown
1960 singles
Male–female vocal duets
1960 songs
Federal Records singles